Samuel Guild (November 7, 1647 – January 1, 1730) represented Dedham, Massachusetts in the Great and General Court. He also served 20 terms as selectman, beginning in 1693.

Public service
In 1675, Guild was a member of Capt.Samuel Moseley's Company during King Philip's War. He was made a freeman at Salem, Massachusetts in May 1678. He was a selectman of Dedham, Massachusetts from 1693 to 1713. In 1703 he was one of a committee to invest and manage school funds. In 1719 he was a delegate to the General Court.

Personal life
Samuel Guild was born November 7, 1647, to  John and Elizabeth (Crook) Guild in Dedham, Mass. Samuel Guild married Mary Woodcock in Dedham on November 29, 1676. Their 10 children were born between 1677 and 1697. He died in Dedham, Massachusetts on January 1, 1730.

References

Works cited

Members of the colonial Massachusetts General Court from Dedham
1640 births
1730 deaths
Dedham, Massachusetts selectmen
Military personnel from Dedham, Massachusetts
People from Salem, Massachusetts